Canta y no llores... ("Sing and Don't Cry...") is a 1949 Mexican musical film directed by Alfonso Patiño Gómez and starring ranchera singer Irma Vila and Carlos López Moctezuma.

Cast
 Irma Vila as Rosario "La Tapatía"
 Carlos López Moctezuma as Enrique
 Rodolfo Landa as Gabriel
 Nelly Montiel as Altagracia
 Felipe de Alba as Chuy Anaya
 María Gentil Arcos as Rosario's mother
 Manolo Noriega as Rosario's grandfather

Songs
 "Feria de las Flores", written by Chucho Monge
 "México lindo", written by Chucho Monge
 "Me das una pena", written by Chucho Monge
 "Besando la Cruz", written by Chucho Monge
 "Guadalajara", written by Pepe Guízar
 "Paloma blanca", written by Miguel Lerdo de Tejada
 "Campanero", written by Federico Ruiz
 "Amor en Swing", written by Federico Ruiz
 "La Tequilera", written by Alfredo D'Orsay
 "Cielito lindo", written by Manuel Castro Padilla

References

External links
 

Mexican musical drama films
Mexican black-and-white films
1940s musical drama films
1949 drama films
1949 films
1940s Mexican films